This was the first edition of the tournament.

Peng Shuai won the title, defeating Lauren Davis in the final 1–6, 7–5, 6–4.

Seeds

Draw

Finals

Top half

Bottom half

Qualifying

Seeds

Qualifiers

Lucky losers

Qualifying draw

First qualifier

Second qualifier

Third qualifier

Fourth qualifier

Fifth qualifier

Sixth qualifier

References
Main Draw
Qualifying Draw

Oracle Challenger Series – Houston - Singles